890 Waltraut is an Eoan asteroid from the outer region of the asteroid belt that was discovered by German astronomer Max Wolf on 11 March 1918. It was named for a character in Richard Wagner's opera, Götterdämmerung (Twilight of the Gods).

This is a member of the dynamic Eos family of asteroids that most likely formed as the result of a collisional breakup of a parent body.

References

External links 
 
 

000890
Discoveries by Max Wolf
Named minor planets
000890
19180311